Robert Gardner Houston (1889 – 9 May 1915) was a Scottish professional football goalkeeper who played in the Scottish League for Partick Thistle, Abercorn and Johnstone.

Personal life 
Houston served as a gunner in the Royal Field Artillery during the First World War and was attached to the Seaforth Highlanders as a private when he was killed in action in France on 9 May 1915. He is commemorated on the Le Touret Memorial.

Career statistics

References

Scottish footballers
1888 births
Scottish Football League players
British Army personnel of World War I
British military personnel killed in World War I
1889 births
Year of birth uncertain
1915 deaths
Footballers from Renfrewshire
Association football goalkeepers
Partick Thistle F.C. players
Abercorn F.C. players
Johnstone F.C. players
Royal Field Artillery soldiers
Seaforth Highlanders soldiers